ვის უნდა ოცი ათასი? (or ვის უნდა 20 000?, English translation: Who wants 20000?, transliteration: Vis Unda 20000) is a Georgian game show based on the original British format of Who Wants to Be a Millionaire?. The show is hosted by Mamuka Gamkrelidze. The main goal of the game is to win 20,000 ₾ by answering 15 multiple-choice questions correctly. There are four lifelines - fifty fifty, phone a friend, ask the audience and switch the question. ვის უნდა 20000? is shown on the Georgian TV station Rustavi 2. When a contestant gets the fifth question correct, he will leave with at least 100 ₾. When a contestant gets the tenth question correct, he will leave with at least 1,600 ₾ (earlier 1,000 ₾).

2009 return
The show returned on September 23, 2009. In the new season, the player is a chosen famous person, who plays with the only aim, to help someone who is in need to cover costs of an urgent surgery or study.

Money Tree

Winners 
The first winner is Manana Maisuradze, who won 20,000 ₾ in 2001. On February 22, 2011, the grand prize was won by Garry Kasparov and his wife, Daria Kasparova. The episode was mainly in Russian, with Georgian subtitles.

External links
 Official website

Who Wants to Be a Millionaire?
2000 Georgia (country) television series debuts
2005 Georgia (country) television series endings
2009 Georgia (country) television series debuts
2011 Georgia (country) television series endings
Georgia (country) television series
2000s Georgia (country) television series
2010s Georgia (country) television series
Rustavi 2 original programming